The 1988 Hong Kong Masters was a professional non-ranking snooker tournament held in August 1988 at the Queen Elizabeth Stadium in Hong Kong. Eight professional players and eight local amateur players participated. Jimmy White won the title, defeating Neal Foulds 6–3 in the final. 

The highest  of the tournament was 118 by Jimmy White.

Prize Fund 
The tournament was sponsored by UK industrial group Lep. Prize money was awarded as follows:
Winner: £28,751
Runner-up: £10,714
Semi-final: £7,143
Quarter-final: £3,571
Highest break: £2,714

Main draw

References

1988 in snooker
1988 in Hong Kong sport
Sport in Hong Kong